Richard Ullberg (born July 16, 1993) is a Finnish ice hockey goaltender. He is currently playing with Guildford Flames of the English Premier Ice Hockey League (EPIHL).

Ullberg made his Liiga debut playing with SaiPa during the 2011–12 SM-liiga season.

References

External links

1993 births
Living people
Finnish ice hockey goaltenders
FoPS players
Green Bay Gamblers players
Guildford Flames players
HC Keski-Uusimaa players
Kokkolan Hermes players
People from Sipoo
SaiPa players
Sportspeople from Uusimaa
Orli Znojmo players
Finnish expatriate ice hockey players in the Czech Republic
Finnish expatriate ice hockey players in the United States
Finnish expatriate ice hockey players in England